Joseph Lamptey (born 10 September 1974) is a former Ghanaian association football referee. He was banned for life for match fixing.

Lamptey was born in Accra. He refereed at the 2015 Africa Cup of Nations and the 2016 Olympics.

FIFA banned Lamptey for life in March 2017 following allegations he manipulated the result of a match between South Africa and Senegal in a 2018 FIFA World Cup qualifying match on 12 November 2016. During the match, Lamptey wrongly awarded a penalty against Senegal's Kalidou Koulibaly, leading to a complaint by the Senegal Football Association. Following the upholding of Lamptey's ban by the Court of Arbitration for Sport, FIFA announced the match would be replayed.

References

External links 
 Joseph Lamptey, WorldReferee.com

Living people
1974 births
Ghanaian football referees
People from Accra
Olympic football referees
Sportspeople banned for life